The 1971–72 UCLA Bruins men's basketball team won the National Collegiate Championship on March 25, 1972, in the Los Angeles Sports Arena with an 81–76 victory over Florida State. It was the sixth consecutive championship (and eighth in nine years) under John Wooden, in his 25th year as head coach at UCLA. This was the final year that the national championship game was played on Saturday.

The 1971–72 Bruins had an undefeated record of 30–0,  winning by an average margin of over thirty points. They won all 26 games in the regular season (fourteen in Pac-8  play), then four in the NCAA tournament. This was the 45th consecutive victory in a winning streak that reached 88 games, an NCAA record.

Season summary
Sophomore Bill Walton lived up to his advance billing, leading the Bruins to a 30–0 record and the National Championship while averaging a double-double (21.1 PPG, 15.5 RPG). Greg Lee and Henry Bibby formed a solid back court, and forwards Keith Wilkes and Larry Farmer were double-digit scorers. Walton's backup, Swen Nater, could have been a star at other schools and went on to a lengthy pro career.

Starting lineup
{| class=wikitable style="text-align:center"
!Position
!Player    
!Class
|-
|F
|Larry Farmer
|Jr.
|-
|F
|Keith Wilkes
|So.
|-
|C
|Bill Walton
|So.
|-
|G
|Greg Lee
|So.
|-
|G
|Henry Bibby
|Sr.
|}

Roster

Schedule

|-
!colspan=9 style=|Regular Season

|-
!colspan=12 style="background:#;"| NCAA Tournament

Notes
 The team opened the season as the No. 1 team in both the AP and UPI polls
 Prior to joining the varsity team, Lee (17.9 ppg), Wilkes (20.0 ppg), and Walton (18.1, 68.6 per cent) were members of the 20–0 Frosh team
 Bruins won the Bruin Classic in Pauley Pavilion
 Bill Walton and Henry Bibby were named to the 1972 Consensus All-America first team

Awards and honors
 Bill Walton, USBWA College Player of the Year
 Bill Walton, Naismith College Player of the Year
 Bill Walton, Adolph Rupp Trophy

Team players drafted into the NBA
 Henry Bibby, New York
 Bill Walton, San Antonio (ABA)

References

External links

1971–72 UCLA Bruins at Sports-Reference.com

Ucla Bruins
UCLA Bruins men's basketball seasons
NCAA Division I men's basketball tournament championship seasons
NCAA Division I men's basketball tournament Final Four seasons
Ucla
UCLA
UCLA